The Galicia national football team is the official football team of Galicia. It is organised by the Galician Football Federation. The team is not affiliated with FIFA or UEFA and is, therefore, only allowed to play friendly matches.

History

Early years
The first game of the Galician national football team took place on 19 November 1922 in Coia, Vigo, beating the Centro team (which encompassed Madrid and the wider Castile region) 4-1 in the quarter-finals of the 1922-23 Copa del Príncipe de Asturias, an official inter-regional tournament organized by RFEF;– This was at a time when there was no national club championship per se, Galician teams would play each other in the Galician Championship and the winner would then go on to face the other regional champions in the Copa del Rey. Galicia then beat the South team in the semi-finals again by a score of 4-1, with the star of the game being local hero Ramón González. Their surprising campaign arose a wave of enthusiasm among the Galician fans, which prompted the Galician federation to organize several friendlies in January and February of 1923, as a warm-up for the final that would be held on the 25th February, and Galicia excelled, winning all 5 games with at least 3 goals scored in each, including an 8-2 win over an English Royal Navy XI and a 7-1 win over a Ferrol/A Coruña XI, the latter of which coming just 7 days before the final, with Ramón González showing great goalscoring form with a hat-trick, but unfortunately, he was unable to play in the final due to injury, and without him, they end up losing to Asturias 1-3, despite scoring first thanks to Balbino. Three months later they lost for a second time, this time to a Lisbon XI (1-2). However, later political developments in Spain made it impossible for the Galicia national football team to take part in official competitions. Hence, after the Copa del Príncipe de Asturias was discontinued in 1924, all games were merely friendlies. The Galician national football team as such ceased all activity during the time of the Spanish Civil War and the subsequent dictatorship (1936–1975).

Revival in 2000s
The project was retaken in the early 1980s, and the first match of the Galician national team after the dictatorship was about to be held on 24 July 1980 in Compostela against the Basque Country, but the players ended on holiday instead. In 1982, before the World Cup in Spain, there was an attempt to organize a match against Cameroon, but they failed to do so. Galicia had to wait 20 years to finally play again, facing the powerful Uruguay on 29 December 2005. Fernando Vázquez, a former Mallorca and Betis coach, was chosen as the coach, and he formed a Galicia XI who had the likes of Diego López, Ricardo Cabanas and José Luis Deus. The San Lázaro stadium was packed for the occasion and surprisingly, they found themselves 3-0 up with 10 minutes to go with goals from Deus (2) and Nano, and even though Uruguay scored two late goals in a 3-2 Galician win, the Galicia fans were very pleased with the team's performance. In December 2006, another game was contested against Ecuador, played in Riazor in A Coruña and Galicia hold them to a 1–1 draw, and on the following year against Cameroon, the result was the same, with Cameroon equalizing only thanks to a last-minute penalty converted by Rigobert Song. Once again, in 2008, the Irmandiña played another friendly game, this time against Iran and they won 3–2 with goals from Nacho Novo (2) and Roberto Losada.

Amateur era
Changes in the composition of the Galician Government after the 2009 elections resulted in a lack of official support for the national team. However, the supporters' group Siareiros Galegos managed to organise a number of non-official international games involving Galician players from lower categories as a sign of protest, giving continuation to the project. These efforts were supported by a number of local governments, which would allow the use of their facilities. Galicia played teams representing Palestine, Western Sahara, Iraqi Kurdistan and Occitania in 2013. Siareiros Galegos announced at that time that it would be the last match until further notice due to the financial situation. On 26 December 2015, however, Siareiros Galegos did set up yet another game, where Galicia faced players representing Senegal.

Second revival

The current president of the FGF, Mr Louzán, days after the Senegal game, announced that the Federation would organise a first-level game again in 2016. It was mentioned that players from the top professional Galician teams, Deportivo and Celta, had lobbied in favour. A game was eventually held on 20 May in Riazor, where Galicia met Venezuela to a 1–1 draw. After the game, the Galician coaches mentioned the keen interest expressed by players to continue with the project and play more games on a regular basis.

Official matches

Friendly matches

Matches organized by Siareiros Galegos

Statistics

Top Scorers

Honours
Prince of Asturias Cup:
 Runners-up (1): 1922–23

Current squad
The following players were called up for the friendly against Venezuela on 20 May 2016.
Age, caps and goals updated as of 21 May 2016 after the match against Venezuela.

Notable players

List of Galician players who also represented FIFA international teams in International and Olympic matches
Players in bold have won the FIFA World Cup. Players in underlined have won a continental championships. Players in italics have won the gold medal at the Olympic Games

See also
 Galicia national basketball team
 Galicia women's national football team

References

External links

 Galician Football Federation
 Galicia Autonomous Team matches at Rec.Sport.Soccer Statistics Foundation

Football in Galicia (Spain)
European national and official selection-teams not affiliated to FIFA
Galicia
Representative teams of association football leagues
1922 establishments in Spain
Sports organizations established in 1922